Miljenko "Mike" Grgić (born April 1, 1923) is a Croatian-American winemaker in California. He was born into a winemaking family in the town of Desne on Croatia's coastal region of  Dalmatia. He is notable for being the winemaker behind the 1973 Chateau Montelena Chardonnay that bested several white Burgundy wines in the wine tasting event that became known as the Judgement of Paris. In recognition of his contributions to the wine industry, Grgich was inducted into the Culinary Institute of America's Vintner's Hall of Fame on March 7, 2008. The tribute came at the same time that Grgich was celebrating his 50th vintage of winemaking in the Napa Valley.

History
He attended the University of Zagreb Faculty of Agriculture, where he studied viticulture and enology. However, he learned about California and wanted to leave the then-Yugoslavia to become a winemaker there. In 1954, he left communist Yugoslavia for West Germany, obtaining a fellowship to study there. From there he emigrated to Canada and upon finally receiving a job offer from a winery in California, Grgich was able to go there.

After working at a number of wineries in the Napa Valley — including Souverain Winery, Christian Brothers Cellars, Beaulieu Vineyard (working alongside André Tchelistcheff), and Robert Mondavi — Grgich became the winemaker and limited partner at Chateau Montelena. His 1973 vintage Chardonnay was selected to compete in the historic Paris Wine Tasting of 1976, where it was ranked the number one white wine. A dramatized version of the story is told in the 2008 film Bottle Shock which did not depict Grgich because "he did not want to be part of it."

This success permitted Grgich (with business partner Austin Hills of Hills Brothers Coffee) to establish his own winery, Grgich Hills Cellar in Rutherford, California.  The winery, which changed names to Grgich Hills Estate in 2006, owns  of vineyards and produces 70,000 cases of wine each year. Its very first vintage won the Great Chardonnay Showdown, with 221 competitors from countries around the world.

See also

List of wine personalities

References

External links
Grape Radio interview with Mike Grgich - Part 1 and Part 2
 California Winery Advisor Grgich Hills Estate
 Grgich Hills Estate

1923 births 
American viticulturists
Living people
People from Kula Norinska
Yugoslav emigrants to the United States
American people of Croatian descent
American winemakers
People from Napa County, California
History of Napa County, California
Wine merchants
Faculty of Agriculture, University of Zagreb alumni
Yugoslav expatriates in West Germany
Yugoslav expatriates in Canada